The Treaty of Wismar was signed on 20 March 1636 by France and Sweden at Wismar in Mecklenburg. The accord was negotiated for Sweden by Lord High Chancellor Axel Oxenstierna, Count of Södermöre who was regent for Christina, Queen of Sweden. The signatories agreed to unite forces against the Habsburgs, with France attacking on the left bank of the Rhine River and Sweden fighting in Silesia and Bohemia. The Treaty of Wismar was eventually ratified in 1638 by the Treaty of Hamburg.

See also
List of treaties

References

Related reading
Parker, Geoffrey; Adams, Simon (1997)  The Thirty Years' War (Routledge. 2 ed.)  
Tryntje Helfferich, translator (2009) The Thirty Years War: A Documentary History	(Hackett Publishing Company, Inc.)

External links
The Later Years of the Thirty Years' War (1635-1648) - Chapter XIII
Count Axel Gustafsson of Oxenstierna
Chronology of Sweden

1636 in France
1636 treaties
Treaties of the Swedish Empire
Treaties of the Kingdom of France
1636 in Sweden
France–Sweden relations